Duakar (Dargwa: ДугIахъар) is a rural locality (a selo) and the administrative centre of Duakarsky Selsoviet, Dakhadayevsky District, Republic of Dagestan, Russia. The population was 250 as of 2010.

Geography
Duakar is located 34 southwest km of Urkarakh (the district's administrative centre) by road. Urari and Guladty are the nearest rural localities.

Nationalities 
Dargins live there.

References 

Rural localities in Dakhadayevsky District